General elections were held in Uruguay on 27 November 1994, alongside a double referendum. The result was a narrow victory for the Colorado Party, which won the most seats in the Chamber of Deputies and the Senate and received the most votes in the presidential election.

Tabaré Vázquez of the Broad Front received the most votes of any presidential candidate. However, former president Julio Maria Sanguinetti returned to office by virtue of the Colorados receiving the most votes of any party. Under the multi-candidate Ley de Lemas system in effect at the time, the highest-finishing candidate of the party that won the most votes was elected president. Vázquez finished just 12,100 fewer votes than the combined vote for the runner-up National Party, even though he won over 121,000 more votes than Sanguinetti. At the time, this was the best showing for a third party since the presidential system was reinstituted with the 1967 constitution.

They were the last presidential elections conducted under the Ley de Lemas system, which had been used for much of the 20th century and had been reinstituted in 1967. In 1996 a referendum amended the constitution to restrict each party to a single presidential candidate, effective from the 1999 elections.

Results

Further reading

References

External links
Politics Data Bank at the Social Sciences School – Universidad de la República (Uruguay)

Uruguay
Elections in Uruguay
General
Uruguay
Julio María Sanguinetti